Chris Lewis defeated Wally Masur 7–5, 6–0, 2–6, 6–4 to win the 1985 Benson and Hedges Open singles competition. Danny Saltz was the defending champion.

Seeds
A champion seed is indicated in bold text while text in italics indicates the round in which that seed was eliminated.

  John Fitzgerald (semifinals)
  John Lloyd (second round)
  Leif Shiras (second round)
  Dan Cassidy (first round)
  Brad Drewett (quarterfinals)
  Peter Doohan (quarterfinals)
  Chris Lewis (champion)
  Wally Masur (final)

Draw

Key
 Q - Qualifier
 NB: The Final was the best of 5 sets while all other rounds were the best of 3 sets.

Final

Section 1

Section 2

External links
 Association of Tennis Professional (ATP) – 1985 Men's Singles draw

Singles
ATP Auckland Open